Molecular Heinosity is the sixth studio album by keyboardist Derek Sherinian, released on March 24, 2009 through InsideOut Music.

Track listing

Personnel
Derek Sherinian – keyboard, engineering, mixing, production
Zakk Wylde – vocals, guitar (tracks 4, 9)
Brett Garsed – guitar (tracks 1–3)
Rusty Cooley – guitar (track 5)
Taka Minamino – guitar (tracks 6, 7, 8)
Virgil Donati – drums (tracks 1, 2, 3)
Brian Tichy – drums (tracks 4, 5, 8, 9), engineering
Jimmy Johnson – bass (tracks 1–3)
Rob Mules – bass (tracks 4, 5, 8)
Tony Franklin – bass (tracks 6, 9)
Tina Guo – cello (tracks 6, 9)
Alex Todorov – engineering, mixing
Peter Tinari – engineering
Daniel Meron – engineering
Matt Flinker – engineering
Dave Allen – engineering
Steve Scanlon – mixing
Brad Vance – mastering

References

External links
 at Guitar Nine Records

Derek Sherinian albums
2009 albums
Inside Out Music albums